Luojishan is a town in southern Sichuan province, Southwest China. It is under the administration of Puge County, Liangshan Yi Autonomous Prefecture. , it administers Luojishan Residential Community and the following seven villages:
Deyu Village
Huangcaoping Village
Luobo Village
Machangping Village
Zire Village
Boluoping Village
Xiaocaohe Village

See also 
 List of township-level divisions of Sichuan

References

Towns in Sichuan
Puge County